IJP the book of surfaces is a book by George L. Legendre, with a foreword by Mohsen Mostafavi.

Overview

IJP the Book of Surfaces was released in 2003 by the publishing arm of the London-based Architectural Association School of Architecture. IJP the Book of Surfaces is an architectural essay with a broad range of additional themes. The book features six essays on the notion of surface written from an architectural, philosophical, literary, mathematical, and computational angle, as well as several lighter asides ranging from cookery to poetry. These seemingly disjointed threads have been given a particular typographic and graphic design treatment, which purports to weave them together into a continuous narrative.

Background and literary references
The book addresses some significant developments of the decade, such as the explosion of computational tools; the emergence of the 3D surface as an architectural signifier of the Digital Revolution;  the profession's fascination with the formal possibilities of surface cladding; and the rise of innovative manufacturing technologies. It is thematically inseparable from two other contemporary titles: Mohsen Mostafavi’s and David Leatherbarrow’s Surface Architecture, an essay on the phenomenology of architectural façades, and Ellen Lupton’s collection Skin: Surface, Substance + Design, which explores the working metaphor of artificial skin in Materials science, fashion and the visual arts. By comparison, the intellectual range of IJP The Book of Surfaces is self-centred and instrumental.  The book, noted Illa Berman, withdraws from external cultural currents and their contexts and emerges from within the formal and computational specificity of the surface itself.   As a piece of writing, it is indebted to the literary school Oulipo. Its treatment of one theme as a collection of vignettes written in different voices (linguistic, mathematical, computational, mock-literary, and pop-cultural) nods back to Raymond Queneau’s 1947 Exercises in Style, in which the same trivial event is told and re-told in different idioms.

Form and content
In keeping with the literary/mathematical spirit of Oulipo, layout, typography, and pagination form an integral part of the book's thesis. The pagination taps the formal affinity between a publisher’s book spread and a mathematician's surface, both of which draw on the concept of mathematical matrix.  Similar mathematical references apply to the title of the work, which combines 'i' and 'j', two symbols commonly used in matrix algebra, with the symbol 'p' (for point), introduced by the author in reference to Euclidean space.

Reception
The book’s argument and restrained use of computer graphics by the standards of the day (dominated then as now by computer-generated renderings) elicited a mixed reception. Historians and theorists  noted its withdrawal from the wider cultural context, its consistent argument, graphic sobriety, and theoretical reach. Readers with less time for theory deplored its lack of engagement with other pressing issues of the day, such as sustainability and ecology. They noted its blank and solipsistic tone, occasionally questionable syntax, and pedestrian graphic design. The book's reception reflected accepted disagreements in the architectural community over the meaning of innovation, the finality of computational tools, and the low-burning culture war simmering around these disagreements. After 2015, similar polemic arguments were waged between the trade press  and the self-identifying avant-garde movement of architectural parametricism (the author of IJP The Book of surfaces has distanced himself from the broader cultural claims of the movement ).

References

Architectural Association School of Architecture
Architecture books
Mathematics books
Computer books
Design books
Philosophy books